Diplodiscus is a genus of flowering plants in the family Malvaceae sensu lato or Tiliaceae.

There are about 9 or 10 species. They are trees and shrubs with bell-shaped flowers.

Species
Species:
Diplodiscus aureus	
Diplodiscus decumbens	
Diplodiscus hookerianus
Diplodiscus longifolius	
Diplodiscus longipetiolatus	
Diplodiscus microlepis
Diplodiscus paniculatus
Diplodiscus scortechinii
Diplodiscus suluensis	
Diplodiscus trichospermus
Diplodiscus verrucosus

References

 
Malvaceae genera
Taxa named by Nikolai Turczaninow
Taxonomy articles created by Polbot